Ko Kut is a district (amphoe) of Trat province, eastern Thailand, consisting of a group of islands. With a population of 2,894 in 2011, it is the district with the smallest population of all Thailand.

History
Originally the area of the district was part of the sub-district (tambon) Ko Chang, Laem Ngop district. In 1952, the sub-district Ko Mak was established to cover the whole island, at that time subdivided into four villages (mubans). In 1980, three villages of Ko Mak were split off to create sub-district Ko Kut. On 1 April 1990, the government upgraded tambon Ko Kut together with tambon Ko Mak to a minor district (king amphoe).

The Thai government on 15 May 2007 upgraded all 81 minor districts to full districts. With publication in the Royal Gazette on 24 August the upgrade became official.

As local government entities, the two tambon administrative organizations (TAO) were created in 2003 and 2004 respectively. The Tambon Council Ko Kut was upgraded to a TAO in 2003, and Ko Mak in 2004.

Geography
The largest island in the district, Ko Kut, is a major island dotted with seaside villages and coconut plantations. It is about 60 minutes from the mainland by speedboat.

Administration
The district is divided into two sub-districts (tambons), which are further subdivided into eight villages (mubans). There are two tambon administrative organizations (TAO), one for each sub-district.

Gallery

References

External links

amphoe.com

Ko Kut
Kut